A Choice of Kipling's Verse, made by T. S. Eliot, with an essay on Rudyard Kipling is a book first published in December 1941 (by Faber and Faber in UK, and by Charles Scribner's Sons in U.S.A.). It is in two parts. The first part is an essay by American-born British poet T. S. Eliot (1888-1965), in which he discusses the nature and stature of British poet Rudyard Kipling (1865-1936). The second part consists of Eliot's selection from Kipling's poems.

A Choice of Kipling's Verse was republished in 1963.

Critical reception

A Choice of Kipling's Verse rapidly attracted critical attention, both supportive and hostile, on both sides of the Atlantic.

W. J. Turner said that "Mr. Eliot's essay is an admirable example of the finest type of criticism. He succeeds in making us look at his subject's work with freshly opened eyes and he is at once sober, illuminating and sound".

George Orwell naturally took the opportunity to write an extended political essay, which incidentally included his own appraisal of Kipling as man and poet. Orwell condemned Kipling for his imperialism, but defended him from charges of fascism which had recently been raised against him. He disliked Kipling's use of the vernacular. He summed up Kipling as a "good bad poet", where a "good bad poem is a graceful monument to the obvious."

Mulk Raj Anand believed that Eliot had over-praised Kipling's critical thought.

A pseudonymous reviewer in New English Weekly wrote, "Mr. Eliot offers an important defense of Kipling's imperialism".

English poet Norman Nicholson asserted his right as one of the presumed intended audience to comment, and gave his own, somewhat equivocal, opinion on Kipling.

Marjorie Farber praised Eliot for his "valuable distinction between ballad-makers and poetry-makers", and for his clearing away some of the prejudices against Kipling; but regretted his failure to acknowledge Kipling's "pleasure in hating".

Louise Bogan wrote, "It is [...] strange to see [Eliot] bending the subtle resources of his intelligence in a hopeless cause" (i.e. that of rehabilitating Kipling).

William Rose Benét wrote (ambiguously), "[Eliot] is not a genius, like Kipling, but his is a subtle and interesting mind".

Lionel Trilling placed Kipling's book in a larger, political and literary context in The Nation (in copyright, and not readable online, but readable in his The Liberal Imagination). His summary response:

W. H. Auden wrote a two-page review for The New Republic (in copyright, and not readable online), which Mildred Martin has summarized as "Little on Eliot, chiefly in praise of Kipling".

Carl T. Naumburg called Eliot's choice of poems "a scholarly and intelligently chosen anthology" and "an altogether excellent selection"; and said that "it is obvious that the essay not the anthology is of importance", and that the essay "will always be regarded as a work of outstanding importance in the field of Kiplingiana".

In 2008, Roger Kimball described Eliot's essay as "partly, but only partly, an effort at rehabilitation". "[H]is essay turns on a distinction between 'verse'at which Kipling is said to exceland 'poetry,' which, says Eliot, he approaches but rarely and then only by accident." Kimball summarised the essay as "sensitive, intelligent, and a subtle masterpiece of deflation", and also said that "Eliot wants to preserve a place for Kipling, but he also wants to put him in his placenot, we are meant to understand, the same (and higher) place occupied by Eliot himself".

The book

Eliot's essay
Eliot's essay occupies 32 pages, and is dated 26 September 1941. It is divided into two sections. (Numerical superscripts in the following summary refer to page numbers in the 1963 edition.)

Eliot doubted whether anyone could make the most of two such different forms of expression as poetry and imaginative prose. He asserted that for Kipling neither form could be judged individually, and that he was the inventor of a mixed form.5 He called Kipling a ballad-maker, someone whose poems could be understood at first hearing, so that his poems had to be defended against the charge of excessive lucidity, not that of obscurity; and against the charge of being jingles.6,9 He singled out "Danny Deever" as remarkable in both technique and content.11-12 He contrasted the dramatic monologues "McAndrew's Hymn" and "The 'Mary Gloster'", which he considered to belong together.13-14 He noted the "important influence of Biblical imagery and the Authorised Version language upon [Kipling's] writing", and suggested that Kipling was both a great epigram writer and (on the strength of "Recessional") a great hymn writer.16

Eliot found it impossible to fit Kipling's poems into one or another distinct class. The later poems are more diverse than the early. Neither "development" nor "experimentation" seems the right description. The critical tools which Eliot was accustomed to use did not seem to work.16-17 He said that "most of us" (i.e. poets) were interested in form for its own sake, and with musical structure in poetry, leaving any deeper meaning to emerge from a lower level; in contrast to Kipling, whose poems were designed to elicit the same response from all readers.18 Eliot defended himself against the hypothetical charge that he had been briefed in the cause of some hopelessly second-rate writer. He asserted that Kipling "knew something of the things which are underneath, and of the things which are beyond the frontier". He next said, "I have not explained Kipling's verse nor the permanent effect it can have on you. It will help if I can keep him out of the wrong pigeon-holes".19-20 He then quoted in full one poem, "The Fabulists" (1914-1918),(ws)  which he said showed Kipling's integrity of purpose and which he thought would have more effect in the essay than in the body of the book.21-22

Eliot opened the second part of his essay by restating his original proposition: that Kipling's prose and verse have to be considered together; while calling him "the most inscrutable of authors" and "a writer impossible wholly to understand and quite impossible to believe".22 He wondered whether Kipling's world-view had been shaped by his upbringing in India under the British Raj - and argued that one of his defining features was his acceptance of all faiths and beliefs, as exemplified in his novel Kim.23-24 He compared Kipling to Dryden, another English writer who put politics into verse: "[T]he two men had much in common. Both were masters of phrase, both employed rather simple rhythms with adroit variations. [...] [T]hey were both classical rather than romantic poets".25-26 For both men, wisdom was more important than inspiration, and the world about them than their own feelings. Nevertheless, Eliot did not wish to overstress the likeness, and recognised the differences.26

Kipling thought his verse and prose as both being for a public purpose. Eliot warned against taking Kipling out of his time, and against exaggerating the importance of a particular piece or phrase which a reader might dislike. He considered that Edward Shanks had missed the point when he called the poem "Loot" (ws) "detestable". In Kipling's military poems, he had tried to describe the soldier (serving or discharged, both unappreciated at home), and not to idealise him. He was exasperated both by sentimentalism and by depreciation and neglect.26-27

Eliot attributed Kipling's development to the time he had spent in India; on travel and in America; and finally settled in Sussex. Kipling had a firm belief in the British Empire and what he thought it should be, while recognising its faults. He was more interested in individuals than in man in the mass. Eliot found Kipling in some way alien, as if from another planet. People who are too clever are distrusted. He compared Kipling with another outsider, the 19th century British politician Benjamin Disraeli.27-28

Kipling had the misfortune of early success, so that critics judged him by his early work and did not revise their opinions to take account of the later.28 He had been called both a Tory (for his content) and a journalist (for his style); in neither case as a compliment. Eliot disagreed, except insofar as those terms could be considered honourable. He dismissed the charge that Kipling believed in racial superiority. Rather, he believed that the British had a natural aptitude to rule and to rule well. He admired people from all races; as can be seen from Kim, which Eliot called "his maturest work on India, and his greatest book". A problem with Kipling was that he expressed unpopular ideas in a popular style. So saying, Eliot concluded his discussion of Kipling's early imperialism. Kipling was not doctrinaire and did not have a programme; for which Eliot rated him favourably over H. G. Wells.29-30

Kipling's middle years are marked by "the development of the imperial imagination into the historical imagination", to which his settling in Sussex must have contributed. He was humble enough to submit to his surroundings, and had the fresh vision of a stranger. There is more than one kind of "historical imagination". One gives life to abstractions, and the larger picture. Another implies a whole civilisation from a single individual. Kipling's imagination was of the second kind.30-31 The historical imagination can convey the vast extent of time, or the nearness of the past, or both. Eliot pointed to Puck of Pook's Hill and Rewards and Fairies as doing both. Kipling was a different kind of regional writer from Thomas Hardy; and not just in that Kipling was chronicling a Sussex he wished to preserve and Hardy the decay of a Dorset he had known from boyhood. Kipling did not write about Sussex because he had run out of foreign and imperial material or because the public demand for it had passed, nor because he was a chameleon who took his colour from his surroundings. He was "discovering and reclaiming a lost inheritance".32-33 The most important thing in Kipling's Sussex stories was his vision of "the people of the soil"; not in a Christian but more in a pagan sense, not as a programme for agrarian reform, but as a counterbalance to materialism and industrialism. Eliot noted the contrast in "The Wish House" (a short story in the 1926 collection Debits and Credits) between its supernatural elements and its sordid realism; he found both it and its two accompanying poems "hard and obscure". Kipling had become more than a mere story teller, and more than the man who had felt it his duty to tell his countrymen things they refused to see. He must have known that his own fame and reputation would get in the way of all but a few people understanding his late parables and the skill with which they were constructed; both in his time and afterwards.33-34

Kipling wrote "verse" rather than "poetry" (two terms which Eliot acknowledged he was using loosely). He handled a wide variety of stanza and metre with perfect competence, but produced no revolution in form. The musical interest of his verse - taken as a whole - is subordinated to its meaning, and that differentiates it from poetry. Doing otherwise would have interfered with his intention. Eliot did not imply a value judgment. Kipling did not write verse because he could not write poetry; he wrote verse because it does something which poetry cannot do. He was a great verse writer. Eliot chose not to name any other famous poets who might be called great verse writers; but declared that Kipling's position in that latter class was not only high but unique.34-36

Eliot concluded by saying that if his essay assisted the reader to approach Kipling with a fresh mind, it would have served its purpose.36

Eliot's selection of poems
Eliot did not attempt to define a critical consensus on the merits of any of Kipling's poems. He chose not to include anything which he considered juvenilia. His selection expresses the personal opinion of one major poet on another, and deserves attention for that reason.

The titles in the following list are those used by Eliot. They sometimes differ in minor ways from those chosen by Kipling. Dates are included only where Eliot included them. As superscripts: (ws) links to the text in Wikisource of a poem which has no Wikipedia article; [Poem] links to a reputable online source for the text of a poem not in Wikisource; (na) means that no reputable source has been found.

 This list is complete

"L'Envoi" (Departmental Ditties) (ws)
"Dedication" from Barrack-Room Ballads (ws)
"Sestina of the Tramp-Royal" (1896) (ws) 
"The Greek National Anthem" (1918) {ws) 
"The Broken Men" (1902) (ws)
"Gethsemane" (1914–18) (ws)  
"The Song of the Banjo" (1894) (ws)
"The Pro-Consuls" (ws)
"McAndrew's Hymn" (1893)
"The Mary Gloster" (1894)
"The Ballad of the Bolivar" (1890) (ws) 
"A Song in Storm" (1914–18)
"The Last Chantey" (1892) (ws) 
"The Long Trail" 
"Ave Imperatrix!" (ws) 
"A Song of the English" (1893) (ws)
"The Gipsy Trail" (ws)
"Our Lady of the Snows" (1897) (ws)  
"The Irish Guards" (1918) (ws) 
"The Settler" (1903) (ws)
"Sussex" (1902) (ws) 
"The Vampire" (1897) (ws)
"When Earth's Last Picture Is Painted" (1892) (ws)
"The Ballad of East and West" (1889)
"Gehazi" (1915) (ws) 
"Et Dona Ferentes" (1896) (ws) 
"The Holy War" (1917) 
"France" (1913) 
"The Bell Buoy" (1896)
"Mesopotamia" (1917) 
"The Islanders" (1902) (ws)
"The Veterans" 
"The Dykes" (1902) (ws) 
"The White Man's Burden" (1899)
"Hymn Before Action" (1896) (ws)
"Recessional" (1897)
"'For All We Have and Are'" (1914) (ws)
"The Benefactors" (ws)
"The Craftsman" 
"Samuel Pepys" (1933) (na) 
"'When 'Omer Smote 'Is Bloomin' Lyre'" 
"Tomlinson" (1891) (ws)
"The Last Rhyme of True Thomas" (1893) (ws) 
"The Sons of Martha" (1907) (ws) 
"Epitaphs of the War" (1914–18) (ws) 
"'Bobs'" (1898) (ws) 
"Danny Deever"
"Tommy"
"'Fuzzy-Wuzzy'"
"Screw-Guns" (ws) 
"Gunga Din"
"The Widow at Windsor"
"Belts" (ws) 
"The Young British Soldier" (ws)
"Mandalay"
"Troopin'" (ws)
"The Widow's Party" (ws) 
"Gentlemen-Rankers"
"Private Ortheris's Song" (ws, "My girl she gave me the go onst") 
"Shillin' a Day" (ws)
"'Back to the Army Again'" (ws)
"'Birds of Prey' March" (ws)
"'Soldier an' Sailor Too'" (ws) 
"Sappers" (ws) 
"That Day" (ws)
"'The Men that Fought at Minden'" (ws) 
"The Ladies" (ws)
"'Follow Me 'Ome'" (ws)
"The Sergeant's Weddin'" (ws)
"The 'Eathen" (ws)
"'For to Admire'" (ws)
"The Absent-Minded Beggar"
"Chant-Pagan" (ws)
"Boots"
"The Married Man" (ws)
"Stellenbosch" (ws) 
"Piet" (ws) 
"Ubique"
"The Return" (ws)
"Cities and Thrones and Powers" (ws)
"The Recall" (ws)
"Puck's Song"
"The Way Through the Woods" (ws)
"A Three-Part Song"
"The Run of the Downs" 
"Sir Richard's Song (A.D. 1066)"
"A Tree Song (A.D. 1200)"
"A Charm" (ws)
"Chapter Headings" 
"Cold Iron" (ws)
"'My New-Cut Ashlar'" 
"Non Nobis Domine!" 
"The Waster" (1930) 
"Harp Song of the Dane Women"
"A St. Helena Lullaby" 
"Road Song of the Bandar-Log" (ws) 
"A British-Roman Song (A.D. 406)"
"A Pict Song"
"The Law of the Jungle"
"MacDonough's Song" (ws)
"The Heritage" (ws)
"Song of the Fifth River"
"The Children's Song" (ws)
"If—"
"A Translation" 
"The Land" 
"The Queen's Men" 
"Mine Sweepers" (1914–18)
"The Love Song of Har Dyal" (ws) 
"Mowgli's Song Against People" (ws) 
"'The Trade'" (1914–18) 
"The Runes on Weland's Sword" (1906)
"Song of the Galley-Slaves" 
"The Roman Centurion's Song" (ws)
"Dane-Geld (A.D. 980-1016)"
"Norman and Saxon (A.D. 1100)" 
"Edgehill Fight" 
"The Dutch in the Medway (1664-72)" 
"The Secret of the Machines" (ws)
"Gertrude's Prayer" 
"The Gods of the Copybook Headings" (1919)
"The Storm Cone" (1932) 
"The Appeal"

Notes

Poems

References
  The source used to locate, and to quote from, several of the early reviews of A Choice of Kipling's Verse cited in this article.

Further reading
  Selected passages from Eliot's essay.

1941 poetry books
Rudyard Kipling
Works by T. S. Eliot
British poetry collections